Jim Redlake is a 1930 novel by the British writer Francis Brett Young. It portrays the life of the title character from childhood. Like most of his works, it was influenced by his own life experiences. Scenes set during the East African campaign had been censored from his earlier memoir of the campaign Marching on Tanga. Young later declared it his favourite of his own novels.

References

Bibliography
 Robert Gaudi. African Kaiser: Paul Von Lettow-Vorbeck and the Great War in Africa, 1914-1918. Oxford University Press, 2017.
 Michael Hall. Francis Brett Young. Seren, 1997.

1930 British novels
Novels by Francis Brett Young
Novels set in England
Novels set in Africa
Heinemann (publisher) books